Genetix is a team of superheroes appearing in American comic books published by Marvel Comics, under the Marvel UK imprint. The team was created by Andy Lanning, Graham Marks, and Phil Gascoine.

Publication history
The team first appeared in Codename: Genetix #1 (January 1993), which was followed by another limited series called Genetix (October 1993).

Fictional team biography
The pasts of the members of Genetix, except for Base, are unknown. Some or all of them may have had active or latent mutant abilities initially. They were forcibly recruited into the genetic experiments of Dr. Oonagh Mullarkey for Gena-Sys, the genetic research division of Mys-Tech. During the mutation process, their original brain patterns and memories were buried under false memory implants of artificial backgrounds. In addition, their powers have been augmented by their own bio-armor, created from protosilicon implants (derived from the Digitek project) which have also bonded to their DNA strands. Each of the members was fitted with restrainer monitoring harnesses to give them greater control of their developing powers. The group members also developed a symbiotic link with each other that allowed them to operate at enhanced efficiency when they remain within proximity of each other. Throughout their training, control of the members was maintained via a combination of drugs and selective mind-wipes. These processes took approximately five years to complete, including training and indoctrination.

When Killpower was sent through time by the Time Guardian to locate a device called the Chronifact, Mullarkey sent the newly created Genetix to follow and hopefully retrieve him. They followed him to Ancient Egypt (and a conflict with Rama-Tut), then another period nearly 1 million years BC, then a few years before their original point of departure to the past, and finally to the end of time, before returning to the modern era.

Five years later, the Genetix, still working as agents of Gena-Sys under Dr. Mullarkey, battle the mutated fungus Sporr, and become involved in the struggle against Prime Evil, another of Dr. Mullarkey's genetic creations. During the struggle with Prime Evil, they learn of Mullarkey's true nature and goals and discover that all of their memories were false implants. Wishing nothing to do with the evil of Mys-Tech, the Genetix break free and strike out on their own.

Panther, a Mys-Tech spy within the Gene Dogs, plants false evidence that sends them after Genetix. After a brief battle, they team up to battle a monstrous mutate of Mys-Tech.

Genetix receive some training under Dark Angel. They then invade Gena-Sys to learn their true origins. This brings them into conflict with the Psycho-Warriors and Tektos. In the course of their struggles, they learned of Gena-Sys' plans to create/harvest more genetically mutated agents in the Psight Corporation. Despite the efforts of Tektos, they manage to destroy the Swiss base of the Psight Corporation. Vesper uncovers the history files of the Genetix, although only Base's past is actually divulged.

Genetix learn of the existence of Death Metal and attempt to stop him from impregnating Krista Marwan. They fail in this, but they do prevent him from abducting her.

After M-Day
In the Civil War: Battle Damage Report, Base is considered as a possible recruit for the Initiative.

Notes

References

Genetix at the Appendix to the Handbook of the Marvel Universe

Codename: Genetix at the Big Comic Book DataBase

Genetix at the Big Comic Book DataBase

1993 comics debuts
Marvel UK teams
Marvel UK titles